Fexco is an Ireland-based financial services and financial technology company focusing on bureau de change and payment card services. Its head office is located in Killorglin, County Kerry. As of 2019, Fexco reports it has more than 2,500 staff and of these, 1,200 are based in Ireland, with other staff in 29 countries worldwide, including the UK, Spain, New Zealand, USA, Middle East and Asia.

History
Fexco was set up in 1981 by Brian McCarthy, originally to provide bureau de change services to the Irish market. McCarthy, now acting as Fexco chairman, is also chairman of the Irish Prisons Board.

Former Tánaiste Dick Spring was appointed as an executive vice-chairman of Fexco in 2002.

As of 2009, services offered by Fexco included prize bonds, dynamic currency conversion and related customer services.

In 2010, Fexco acquired 75% of Goodbody Stockbrokers for a reported bargain price of €24 million with the management take the remaining 25% stake in the business. The Financial Times commented that the modest price tag placed on Ireland’s oldest stockbroker and "one-time bastion of Ireland's Protestant business elite" was just another measure of the dramatic decline of the Irish economy.

In February 2015, Denis McCarthy was appointed chief executive officer of Fexco. McCarthy had been active chief executive since Gavin O'Neill departed the company in 2014. The Currency Exchange Corporation was acquired by Fexco in 2016.

In 2018, Fexco turned down a deal to sell Goodbody to a Chinese consortium for €150 million. In November 2019, it was announced that Goodbody could to be sold to Bank of China for approximately €150 million, however by July 2020 it was reported that Bank of China was withdrawing from this acquisition citing uncertainty over the Coronavirus pandemic. In March 2021, AIB confirmed that it had agreed to acquire Goodbody Stockbrokers for €138 million.

References

External links

  Official website

Financial services companies of the Republic of Ireland
Foreign exchange companies
Financial technology companies
Irish brands